Tarmo Linnumäe (born 11 November 1971) is an Estonian retired footballer who played as a midfielder.

International career
He obtained a total number of 29 caps for the Estonia national football team, scoring no goals. He earned his first official cap on 3 June 1992, when Estonia played Slovenia in a friendly match. Linnumäe also played as a professional in Sweden and Finland.

References

1971 births
Living people
Sportspeople from Tartu
Estonian footballers
Estonia international footballers
FC Flora players
Tartu JK Tammeka players
Estonian expatriate footballers
Estonian expatriate sportspeople in Finland
Expatriate footballers in Finland
Estonian expatriate sportspeople in Sweden
Expatriate footballers in Sweden
Association football midfielders